is a Japanese voice actress. Some of her major roles are Koyomi from Girls Bravo, Shinobu Maehara in Love Hina,  Tomoe Kashiwaba in Rozen Maiden, Karinka from Steel Angel Kurumi, and Subaru Mikage in Comic Party. In video games she voices Kurara in Purikura Daisakusen, Ai Senou in Hourglass of Summer, Chizuru Sakaki in the Rumbling Hearts / Muv-Luv visual novels, and Souffle Rossetti in Star Ocean: Till the End of Time.

Filmography

Anime
{| class="wikitable sortable plainrowheaders"
|+ List of voice performances in anime
! Year
! Title
! Role
! class="unsortable"| Notes
! class="unsortable"| Source
|-
|-
|  || Bit the Cupid || Cursor ||  || 
|-
| –99 || Agent Aika || Black Delmo || OAV series || 
|-
|  || Hanitarou Desu:ja:ハニ太郎です。 || Hani-ko, Miki Hirayama, Goddess ||  || 
|-
|  || Marvelous Melmo|| Tako || 1998 redub || 
|-
|  || Toki no Daichi:ja:刻の大地 || Fureaフレア || OVA || 
|-
|  || D4 Princess|| Doris Rurido ||  || 
|-
|  || Kyorochan|| Go-chan ||  ||
|-
| –2001 || Steel Angel Kurumi series || Karinka ||  || 
|-
|  || Shūkan Storyland:ja:週刊ストーリーランド || Girl || || 
|-
|  || Tail of Two Sistersシスターズ輪舞 || Yuibi Kawano川野唯美 || OVA AdultAs Norika Ashiro || 
|-
|  || Boys Be... || Risa Fujiki || TV ep. 2 || 
|-
| –02 || Love Hina series || Shinobu Maehara || Also OVAs and specials || 
|-
|  || Hand Maid May|| High School Girl ||  || 
|-
|  || Inuyasha|| Saya ||  || 
|-
|  || Ghost Stories|| Saeko ||  || 
|-
|  || Angelic Layer|| Girl, TJ's deus, Classmate, Torimaki, Kindergartener ||  || 
|-
|  || Haré + Guu || Laya ||  || 
|-
|  || Star Ocean EX|| Eleanor ||  || 
|-
|  || Go! Go! Itsutsugo Land|| Yurika Nohara ||  || 
|-
|  || Immoral Sisters || Tomoko Kitazawa || Adult OVA series || 
|-
|  || Magical Meow Meow Taruto|| Charlotte ||  || 
|-
|  || s-CRY-ed || Scherice Adjani ||  || 
|-
|  || A Little Snow Fairy Sugar|| Maiden ||  ||
|-
|  || Najica Blitz Tactics|| Fuyuki ||  || 
|-
|  || Cheeky Angel|| Yoshimi Shirasagi ||  || 
|-
|  || Atashin'chi|| Nohara ||  || 
|-
|  || Jing: King of Bandits|| Vermouth ||  || 
|-
|  || G-On Riders || Yayoi Hoshikawa ||  || 
|-
|  || Mao-chan || Carol Cameron ||  || 
|-
|  || Mobile Suit Gundam Seed|| Mayura Labatt ||  || 
|-
|  || Immoral Sisters 2 || Tomoko Kitazawa || OVA Adult || 
|-
|  || Gad Guard|| Aiko Mary Harmony ||  || 
|-
|  || Rumic Theater|| Kamoshita ||  || 
|-
|  || Planetes|| Lucy Askam ||  || 
|-
|  || Mermaid Melody Pichi Pichi Pitch Pure|| Alala ||  || 
|-
|  || Sgt. Frog|| Heroine ||  || 
|-
|  || Melody of Oblivion|| Monster King S II ||  || 
|-
|  || Hourglass of Summer|| Ai Senou || OVA ||
|-
| –05 || Girls Bravo series || Koyomi Hare Nanaka ||  || 
|-
| –13 || Rozen Maiden series || Tomoe Kashiwaba ||  || 
|-
| –05 || Akane Maniax || Chizuru Sakaki || OVA seriesAs Kaho Takayanagi || 
|-
|  || Mobile Suit Gundam SEED Astray|| Kisato Yamabuki / Red Frame || promotional OVA ||
|-
|  || Fushigiboshi no Futagohime|| Jill ||  || 
|-
|  || Comic Party Revolution|| Subaru Mikage ||  || 
|-
|  || Doraemon|| Tsubasa Ito, Cat, Non-chan, Hoka Minami || 2005 TV series || 
|-
|  || Aria the Animation|| Ami ||  || 
|-
|  || Gun Sword|| Fasalina ||  || 
|-
| –08 || Code Geass series || Rakshata Chawla ||  || 
|-
|  || Kujibiki Unbalance|| Komaki Asagiri || replaced Yukari Tamura || 
|-
|  || Blue Drop|| Onomil ||  || 
|-
|  || Kimi ga Nozomu Eien: Next Season|| Chizuru Sakaki || OVA ||
|-
|  || Kurenai || Head maid, Yasuko ||  || 
|-
|  || Jungle Taitei – Yūki ga Mirai wo Kaeru || Tsushin || TV special 2009 || 
|-
|  || Gokyodai Monogatariご姉弟物語 || Clerk ||  || 
|-
|  || Stitch!|| Announcer ||  || 
|-
|  || Tegami Bachi Reverse|| Sonny ||  || 
|-
|  || The Knight in the Area|| Passing woman ||  || 
|-
|  || Kuromajo-san ga Toru!! || Toko Miyase ||  || 
|-
|  || Girls und Panzer|| Momoga, Yuri Isuzu ||  || 
|-
|  || Fantasista Doll|| Mikoto Uno, Anchi, Tennis club senior ||  || 
|-
|  || Comical Psychosomatic Medicine|| Wife || ONA || 
|-
|-
|  || Active Raid|| Rin Yamabuki ||  || 
|-
|  || Anpanman || Eriko Aoki || OVA ||
|-
|  || Case Closed || Various characters ||  ||
|-
|  || |Crayon Shin-chan || Mieno, Chikage, cabin attendant, Katayama ||  ||
|-
|}

Film

Video games

Drama CDs

Dubbing

Tokusatsu

 References 

 Gifford, Kevin. "The Official Art of Comic Party Revolution". (March 2007) Newtype USA''. pp. 103–109.

External links 
  
 Masayo Kurata at GamePlaza Haruka voice actor database 
 Masayo Kurata at Hitoshi Doi's Seiyuu Database 
 

1969 births
Living people
Japanese video game actresses
Japanese voice actresses
People from Yokkaichi